The Genesis flood narrative (chapters 6–9 of the Book of Genesis) is the Hebrew version of the universal flood myth. It tells of God's decision to return the universe to its pre-creation state of watery chaos and remake it through the microcosm of Noah's ark.

The Book of Genesis was probably composed around the 5th century BCE, although some scholars believe that Primeval history (chapters 1–11), including the flood narrative, may have been composed and added as late as the 3rd century BCE. It draws on two sources, called the Priestly source and the non-Priestly or Yahwist, and although many of its details are contradictory, the story forms a unified whole.

A global flood as described in this myth is inconsistent with the physical findings of geology, archeology, paleontology, and the global distribution of species. A branch of creationism known as flood geology is a pseudoscientific attempt to argue that such a global flood actually occurred. Some Christians have preferred to interpret the narrative as describing a local flood, instead of a global event.

Summary

The story of the flood takes up chapters 6–9 of the Book of Genesis, the first book of the Bible. Ten generations after the creation of Adam God saw that the earth was corrupt and filled with violence, and he decided to destroy what he had created. But God found one righteous man, Noah, and to him he confided his intention: "I am about to bring on the Flood ... to eliminate everywhere all flesh in which there is the breath of life ... ." So God instructed him to build an ark (in Hebrew, a chest or box), and Noah entered the Ark in his six hundredth year, and on the 17th day of the second month of that year "the fountains of the Great Deep burst apart and the floodgates of heaven broke open" and rain fell for forty days and forty nights until the highest mountains were covered to a depth of 15 cubits, and all life perished except Noah and those with him in the Ark. After 150 days, "God remembered Noah ... and  the waters subsided" until the Ark rested on the mountains of Ararat, and on the 27th day of the second month of Noah's six hundred and first year the earth was dry. Then Noah built an altar and made a sacrifice, and God made a covenant with Noah that man would be allowed to eat every living thing but not its blood, and that God would never again destroy all life by a flood.

Composition

The consensus of modern scholars is that Genesis was composed around the 5th century BCE, 
but as the first eleven chapters show little relationship to the rest of the book, some scholars believe that this section (the so-called Primeval History) may have been composed as late as the 3rd century BCE.

It is generally agreed that the history draws on two sources, one called the Priestly source, the other non-Priestly or Yahwist, and their interweaving is evidenced in the doublets (i.e., repetitions) contained within the final story. But despite this disagreement on details the story forms a unified whole (some scholars see in it a "chiasm", a literary structure in which the first item matches the last, the second the second-last, and so on), and many efforts have been made to explain this unity, including attempts to identify which of the two sources was earlier and therefore influenced the other. Some scholars have even questioned whether the story is actually based on two different sources.

Sources
The following table compares the Yahwist and Priestly sources. Each provides a complete story-line, with introductions and conclusions, reasons for the flood, and theologies.

Comparative mythology

Scholars believe that the flood myth originated in Mesopotamia during the Old Babylonian Period (c.1880-1595 BCE) and reached Syro-Palestine in the latter half of the 2nd millennium BCE. Extant texts show three distinct versions, the Sumerian Epic of Ziusudra, (the oldest, found in very fragmentary form on a single tablet dating from about 1600 BCE, although the story itself is older), and as episodes in two Akkadian language epics, the Atrahasis and the Epic of Gilgamesh. The name of the hero, according to the version concerned, was Ziusudra, Atrahasis, or Utnapishtim, all of which are variations of each other, and it is just possible that an abbreviation of Utnapishtim/Utna'ishtim as "na'ish" was pronounced "Noah" in Palestine.

Numerous and often detailed parallels make clear that the Genesis flood narrative is dependent on the Mesopotamian epics, and particularly on Gilgamesh, which is thought to date from c.1300-1000 BCE.

Flood chronology

Numbers in the Bible often have symbolic or idiomatic meaning, and the 40 days and nights for which rain fell on the Earth indicates a complete cycle.

The flood begins on the 17th day of the second month when "the springs of the great deep burst forth, and the floodgates of the heavens were opened", and after 40 days the ark floats (Genesis 7:11-12). The waters rise and then recede, and on the 17th day of the seventh month (or the 27th day in the Greek version) the ark rests on the mountains (Genesis 8:4). The waters continue to fall, the ark is uncovered on the 1st day of the 1st month of Noah's 601st year, and is opened on the 27th day of his 601st year (Genesis 8:13-14).

The period from the beginning of the flood to the landing on the mountain is five months (the second month to the seventh, Genesis 7:11 and 8:4) and 150 days (8:3), making an impossible five months of 30 days each; the number is schematic, and is based on the Babylonian astronomical calendar of 360 days (12 months of 30 days each). This means that the flood lasts 36 weeks according to the flood calendar, in which an extra day is added to every third month. The number of weeks is symbolically significant, representing the biblical cypher for destruction (the number 6, expressed as 6x6=36), while the number 7 (the number of days in a week) represents the persistence of creation during this time of destruction.

The period while the ark is afloat, i.e. the period during which the Earth is entirely covered by water, represents gap in time, as is confirmed by the strange details of the ages of Noah and Shem. Noah is 600 years old when the flood comes, it ends in his 601st year, and he then lives another 350 years before dying in his 950th year (Genesis 9:28-29); the year taken up by the flood is not counted. Similarly his son Shem is 100 years old on entering the ark (Genesis 7:6) and still 100 years old on fathering Arpachshad two years after the flood.

Scholars have long puzzled over the significance of the flood lasting one year and eleven days (day 17 of year 600 to day 27 of year 601); one solution is that the basic calendar is a lunar one of 354 days, to which eleven days have been added to match a solar year of 365 days.

The "original", Jahwist narrative of the Great Deluge was modest; a week of ostensibly non-celestial rain is followed by a forty-day flood which takes a mere week to recede in order to provide Noah his stage for God's covenant. It is the Priestly source which adds more fantastic figures of a 150-day flood, which emerged by divine hand from the heavens and earth and took ten months to finally stop. That the Jahwist source's capricious and somewhat simplistic depiction of Yahweh is clearly distinguished from the Priestly source's characteristically majestic, transcendental, and austere virtuous Yahweh.

The Priestly flood narrative is the only Priestly text that covers dates with much detail before the Exodus narrative. This is perhaps due to a version of the flood myth that was floating around at the time. There is a text discovered from Ugarit known as RS 94.2953, consisting of fourteen lines telling a first-person account of how Ea appeared to the story's protagonist and commanded him to use tools to make a window (aptu) at the top of the construction he was building, and how he implemented this directive and released a bird. Antoine Cavigneaux's translation of this text made him propose that this fragment belongs to a Mesopotamian flood myth, perhaps Atrahasis or Tablet IX of Gilgamesh, which has a version found in Ugarit (RS 22.421) that contains a first person account of the flood. If this suggestion is correct, then RS 94.2953 represents a unique version of the Mesopotamian flood story. Line 1 of the text says "At the start of the time of the disappearance of the moon, at the beginning of the month". This reference to the lunar date giving the specific date the protagonist released the bird is significant as it is the only variant of the flood story giving a specific date and the rest do not attribute specific dates or calendrical details to the various stages of the flood. Both RS 94.2953 and Genesis 8 are about the flood protagonist releasing a bird on a specific calendrical date in order to find land in the midst of the flood.

Theology: the flood and the creation narrative
The primeval history is first and foremost about the world God made, its origins, inhabitants, purposes, challenges, and failures. It asks why the world which God has made is so imperfect and of the meaning of human violence and evil, and its solutions involve the notions of covenant, law, and forgiveness. The Genesis creation narrative (Genesis 1–2) deals with God's creation and God's repentance is the rationale behind the flood narrative, and in the Priestly source (which runs through all of Genesis and into the other four books of the Torah) these two verbs, "create" and "forgive", are reserved exclusively for divine actions.

Intertextuality is the way biblical stories refer to and reflect one another. Such echoes are seldom coincidental—for instance, the word used for ark is the same used for the basket in which Moses is saved, implying a symmetry between the stories of two divinely chosen saviours in a world threatened by water and chaos. The most significant such echo is a reversal of the Genesis creation narrative; the division between the "waters above" and the "waters below" the earth is removed, the dry land is flooded, most life is destroyed, and only Noah and those with him survive to obey God's command to "be fruitful and multiply."

The flood is a reversal and renewal of God's creation of the world. In Genesis 1 God separates the "waters above the earth" from those below so that dry land can appear as a home for living things, but in the flood story the "windows of heaven" and "fountains of the deep" are opened so that the world is returned to the watery chaos of the time before creation. Even the sequence of flood events mimics that of creation, the flood first covering the earth to the highest mountains, then destroying, in order, birds, cattle, beasts, "swarming creatures", and finally mankind. (This parallels the Babylonian flood story in the Epic of Gilgamesh, where at the end of rain "all of mankind had returned to clay," the substance of which they had been made.) The Ark itself is likewise a microcosm of Solomon's Temple.

Later traditions

Jewish
In Jewish folklore, the kind of water that was pouring to the earth for forty days is not common rainfall; rather, God bade each drop pass through Gehenna before it fell to earth, which 'hot rain' scalded the skin of the sinners. The punishment that overtook them was befitting their crime. As their sensual desires had made them hot, and inflamed them to immoral excesses, so they were chastised by means of heated water.

Christianity

The Genesis flood narrative is included in the Old Testament of the Christian Bible (see Books of the Bible). Jesus and the apostles additionally taught on the Genesis flood narrative in New Testament writing (2 Peter 3:6). Some Christian biblical scholars suggest that the flood is a picture of salvation in Christ—the Ark was planned by God and there is only one way of salvation through the door of the Ark, akin to one way of salvation through Christ. Additionally, some scholars commenting on the teaching of the apostle Peter, connect the Ark with the resurrection of Christ; the waters burying the old world but raising Noah to a new life. Christian scholars also highlight that 1 Peter 3:18-22 demonstrates the Genesis flood as a type to Christian baptism.

Gnosticism
In the 3rd century Gnostic codex now referred to as the Hypostasis of the Archons, it is the corrupt rulers (Archons) who decide to flood the world in order to dispose of most of mankind. However, Noah is spared and told to build an ark. But when his wife Norea wants to board the ark, Noah attempts to not let her, thus she uses her divine power to blow on the ark, causing it to be consumed by fire. Noah later builds the ark a second time. When the Archons try to seize Norea, she calls out to God for help, then the angel Eleleth appears and scares away the Archons, revealing to Norea that she is a divine child of the great spirit. A different view is found in the Secret Book of John; instead of an ark, Noah hides in a bright cloud.

Mandaeism
Mandaeism teaches that the flood of Noah was the last of three events where the world's population was reduced to a single family. Thirty generations after Adam, most of the population was killed by pestilence and war, leaving only Ram and his wife Rud. Twenty-five generations later, most of the population was killed by fire, leaving only Shurbai and his wife Shurhabil. Fifteen generations later, most of the population was killed by flood, leaving only Noah and Shem, in addition to the latter's wife Nuraitha.

Islam
The story of Noah and the Great Flood is related in the Qur'an in the surah Nūḥ.

Historicity
While some scholars have tried to offer possible explanations for the origins of the flood myth including a legendary retelling of a possible Black Sea deluge, the general mythological exaggeration and implausibility of the story are widely recognized by relevant academic fields. The acknowledgement of this follows closely the development of understanding of the natural history and especially the geology and paleontology of the planet.

Flood geology

The development of scientific geology had a profound impact on attitudes towards the biblical flood narrative. By bringing into question the biblical chronology, which placed the Creation and the flood in a history which stretched back no more than a few thousand years, the concept of deep geological time undermined the idea of the historicity of the Ark itself. In 1823 the English theologian and natural scientist William Buckland interpreted geological phenomena as Reliquiæ Diluvianæ (relics of the flood) "Attesting the Action of an Universal Deluge". His views were supported by others at the time, including the influential geologist Adam Sedgwick, but by 1830 Sedgwick considered that the evidence suggested only local floods. Louis Agassiz subsequently explained such deposits as the results of glaciation.

In 1862, William Thomson (later to become Lord Kelvin) calculated the age of the Earth at between 24 million and 400 million years, and for the remainder of the 19th century, discussion focused not on the viability of this theory of deep time, but on the derivation of a more precise figure for the age of the Earth. Lux Mundi, an 1889 volume of theological essays which marks a stage in the acceptance of a more critical approach to scripture, took the stance that readers should rely on the gospels as completely historical, but should not take the earlier chapters of Genesis literally.
By a variety of independent means, scientists have determined that the Earth is approximately 4.54 billion years old.

So-called "flood geology" was championed in the latter half of the twentieth and on into the twenty-first century by Christian fundamentalists who believe in Young Earth creationism. Historian Ronald Numbers argues that this ideological connection by Christians wanting to challenge aspects of the scientific consensus they believe contradict their religion was first established by the publication of the 1961 book, The Genesis Flood. The scientific community maintains that flood geology is a pseudoscience because it contradicts a variety of facts in geology, stratigraphy, geophysics, physics, paleontology, biology, anthropology, and archeology. For example, in contrast to the catastrophism inherent in flood geology, the science of geology relies on Charles Lyell's established principle of uniformitarianism. In relation to geological forces, uniformitarianism explains the formation of the Earth's features by means of mostly slow-acting forces seen in operation today. In contrast, there is a lack of evidence for the catastrophic mechanisms proposed by flood geologists, and scientists do not take their claims seriously.

Species distribution
By the 17th century, believers in the Genesis account faced the issue of reconciling the exploration of the New World and increased awareness of the global distribution of species with the older scenario whereby all life had sprung from a single point of origin on the slopes of Mount Ararat. The obvious answer involved mankind spreading over the continents following the destruction of the Tower of Babel and taking animals along, yet some of the results seemed peculiar. In 1646 Sir Thomas Browne wondered why the natives of North America had taken rattlesnakes with them, but not horses: "How America abounded with Beasts of prey and noxious Animals, yet contained not in that necessary Creature, a Horse, is very strange".

Browne, among the first to question the notion of spontaneous generation, was a medical doctor and amateur scientist making this observation in passing. However, biblical scholars of the time, such as Justus Lipsius (1547–1606) and Athanasius Kircher (c. 1601–80), had also begun to subject the Ark story to rigorous scrutiny as they attempted to harmonize the biblical account with the growing body of natural historical knowledge. The resulting hypotheses provided an important impetus to the study of the geographical distribution of plants and animals, and indirectly spurred the emergence of biogeography in the 18th century. Natural historians began to draw connections between climates and the animals and plants adapted to them. One influential theory held that the biblical Ararat was striped with varying climatic zones, and as climate changed, the associated animals moved as well, eventually spreading to repopulate the globe.

There was also the problem of an ever-expanding number of known species: for Kircher and earlier natural historians, there was little problem finding room for all known animal species in the Ark. Less than a century later, discoveries of new species made it increasingly difficult to justify a literal interpretation for the Ark story. By the middle of the 18th century only a few natural historians accepted a literal interpretation of the narrative.

See also
 
 Biblical cosmology
 Chronology of the Bible
 Documentary hypothesis
 Mosaic authorship
 Noach (parsha)
 Panbabylonism

Notes

References

Citations

Bibliography

Further reading

 
 
 
 

 
 
 
 
 
 
 
 

Flood narrative
Comparative mythology
Flood myths
Mesopotamian myths
Noach (parashah)